Music for Hi-Fi Bugs (also released as Music from Out of Space) is an album by composer, arranger and conductor Pete Rugolo featuring performances recorded in 1956 and originally released on the EmArcy label as a 12-inch LP. Tracks from this album were later released in stereo on Music from Out of Space and Rugolo Meets Rhythm.

Reception

The AllMusic review by Jason Ankeny noted: "Rugolo's arrangements dazzle, boasting a rich palette of colors and tones that amplify the artistry of the individual performances".

Track listing
All compositions by Pete Rugolo, except where indicated.
 "For Hi-Fi Bugs" - 4:05
 "Once in a While" (Michael Edwards, Bud Green) - 3:40
 "Fawncy Meeting You" (Neal Hefti) - 4:40
 "These Foolish Things" (Jack Strachey, Holt Marvell, Harry Link) - 4:44
 "Later Team" - 2:52
 "Oscar and Pete's Blues" (Oscar Peterson, Rugolo) - 8:12
 "Dream of You" (Sy Oliver) - 5:04
 "Snowfall" (Claude Thornhill) - 3:10

Recorded in Los Angeles, CA on July 9, 1956 (tracks 2, 3, 5 & 7), July 10, 1956 (tracks 1 & 4) and July 11, 1956 (tracks 6 & 8).

Personnel
Pete Rugolo - arranger, conductor
Pete Candoli, Buddy Childers (tracks 2, 3, 5 & 7), Don Fagerquist (tracks 6 & 8), Maynard Ferguson, Ray Linn (tracks 1, 4, 6 & 8), Don Paladino (tracks 1-5 & 7) - trumpet  
Milt Bernhart, Herbie Harper, Frank Rosolino - trombone
George Roberts - bass trombone
John Cave, Vincent DeRosa - French horn
Clarence Karella - tuba
Harry Klee - alto saxophone, alto flute, piccolo
Ronny Lang -  alto saxophone, flute
Gene Cipriano, Dave Pell - tenor saxophone
Chuck Gentry - baritone saxophone
Russ Freeman - piano
Howard Roberts - guitar 
Joe Mondragon - bass
Shelly Manne - drums
Larry Bunker - vibraphone, xylophone, percussion, timpani

References

1956 albums
Pete Rugolo albums
EmArcy Records albums
Albums arranged by Pete Rugolo
Albums conducted by Pete Rugolo

Albums recorded at Capitol Studios